Archeuptychia is a monotypic satyrid butterfly genus described by Walter Forster in 1964. Its sole member, Archeuptychia cluena is found in Brazil. The original name of this species was Papilio cluena as described by Dru Drury in 1782.

References

External links
 Archeuptychia at Tree of Life Web Project

Euptychiina
Monotypic butterfly genera
Taxa named by Walter Forster (entomologist)